Ulrik Flo (born 6 October 1988) is a former Norwegian footballer forward who plays for Fjøra.

He is the nephew of Jostein Flo and Tore Andre Flo.

Club career
He signed for Sogndal in 2007, moving from his youth club Stryn after taking advice from his uncle Jostein.

Ulrik Flo made his debut in Tippeligaen on 20 March 2011, in Sogndal's match against Strømsgodset.

Personal life
Ulrik Flo is a part of the Flo family, he is the son of the former Molde player Kjell Rune Flo, who is the brother of former international footballers Jostein Flo and Tore Andre Flo. When he made his debut in Tippeligaen, he became the seventh person from his extended family to play in the first tier in Norway.

Career statistics

Club

References

External links
 

1988 births
Living people
People from Stryn
Norwegian footballers
Norway youth international footballers
Norwegian expatriate footballers
Expatriate men's footballers in Denmark
Norwegian expatriate sportspeople in Denmark
Sogndal Fotball players
Silkeborg IF players
Danish Superliga players
Danish 1st Division players
Odds BK players
Fredrikstad FK players
Norwegian First Division players
Eliteserien players
Association football forwards
Flo family
Sportspeople from Vestland